Pitman Fracture Zone is an undersea fracture zone named for Dr. Walter C. Pitman II, a geophysicist and pioneer in studies of continental drift and seafloor spreading. Name proposed by Drs. Cande, Haxby and Raymond, Lamont-Doherty Geological Observatory [now Lamont–Doherty Earth Observatory]. Name approved 3/93 (ACUF 256).

Geology of the Southern Ocean